A list of films produced in Italy in 1943 (see 1943 in film):

References

External links
Italian films of 1943 at the Internet Movie Database

Italian
1943
Films